The Method (: Ein Prozess) is a 2009 novel by the German writer Juli Zeh. The story is set in a future "health dictatorship", where laws have been written to optimize the citizens' health. The novel was developed from Zeh's 2007 play with the same title. Reviews in major German newspapers complimented Zeh's focus points and narrative structure, and compared the book to works by authors such as Ray Bradbury and Friedrich Dürrenmatt.

Characters

Mia Holl

Mia Holl is a 34-year-old Biologist and is the main character of the novel. After the death of her brother, Moritz Holl, she gets lonely and depressed. Throughout the book she becomes a rebel against the government. Her dedication to the METHODE is not strong enough to be actively against it. The name 'Mia Holl' comes from the name 'Maria Holl', a woman who was thought to be a witch in the 17th century.

Moritz Holl

Moritz Holl is Mia's 27 year old brother, who even before the story starts commits suicide. He loves nature but is also an independent rebel who wants nothing more than freedom. Because of his complex thoughts he couldn't find a person to talk to and therefore created the Ideal beloved, who he passed on to Mia just before his death. The name 'Moritz Holl' comes from another character named 'Max' (via the household combination Max and Moritz) in another Novel from Juli Zeh.

The Ideal Beloved

The Ideal Beloved is a fictional character who helps Mia through the difficult time after the death of her brother. She has the same ideology and thoughts as Moritz and could be his ghost. After Mia's emotional wound is healed she disappears, since her quest is done.

Bell

Bell is a public prosecutor and a follower of the METHOD. He is a follower of the METHOD and is always in a conflict with Sophie, a young judge.

Lutz Rosentreter

Rosentreter is Mia's lawyer in the process of proving her brother's innocence. He is against the METHOD, since he lost the love of his life because of the government system. Since then he is trying to get revenge.

Kramer

Heinrich Kramer (named after the actual name of Henricus Institor) is Mia's opponent in the Novel. He comes across as a nice Gentleman who has a huge influence on the METHOD and wants to explain the system to everyone. In reality he is a fanatic who can only see his goal.

Wuermer

Wuermer is the moderator of a talk-show. He idolizes Kramer so much that one could see him as Kramer's student. He also mentions that Mia and Moritz founded their own rebellion group.

Sophie
Sophie is a strong, young judge who judges the trial against Mia. She eliminates fights between Bell and Rosentreter and changes the outcome of the trial in Mia's benefit.

Hutschneider

Hutschneider is a 60-year-old judge who helps with the trial against Mia. He though tries to end the trial as fast as possible because of fear of being accused to stand against the METHOD.

See also
 2009 in literature
 German literature

References

External links
 The Method at the publisher's website

2009 German novels
Dystopian novels
German-language novels
Novels based on plays
Novels by Juli Zeh